Santorín (4 August 1970-19 December 1993) was a Peruvian Thoroughbred racehorse who was the first to win the Peruvian Quadruple Crown and is known as ''. He went on to win the Gran Premio Carlos Pellegrini on 4 November 1973 by 13 lengths, a victory that is stated to have saved Peruvian horse racing. Santorín is regarded as the most important racehorse in Peruvian history and has a monument and race named after him at the Hipódromo de Monterrico. Santorín died on 19 December 1993, and he was buried at his owner's Haras Barlovento, where there now stands a museum dedicated to him.

The Clásico Santorín is a Group 3 race named after Santorín, run over 2800 meters on turf for horses three years old or older at Hipódromo de Monterrico.

A life size bronze statue of Santorín stands at Hipódromo de Monterrico, made in 1981 by Miguel Baca Rossi. In September, 2017, the statue moved to the paddock.

Background 
Santorín was foaled on 4 August 1970 at Haras La Cabaña, owned by Claudio Fernández Concha. He was originally named Blue Prince, and was renamed to Santorín after being purchased in 1972 by Augusto Maggiolo for his Stud Barlovento.

Racing Career 

During his Quadruple Crown run, as well as the Gran Premio Carlos Pellegrini, Santorín was ridden by jockey Arthuro Morales.

Santorín was the favorite in the Polla de Potrillos, a race he won from Parnasus by 2.5 lengths in 1:36. He won both the Clásico Ricardo Ortiz de Zevallos and Derby Nacional by 15 lengths each.

In the Gran Premio Carlos Pellegrini, Santorín ran towards the back of the field for much of the running. About 2000 meters into the 3000 meter race, he began to move forward and was at the front by the time the field entered the homestretch. Santorín separated from the rest of the field about 300 meters from the finish line and drew off to win by 13 lengths.  '', stated by Peruvian television personality  during this race, became a well-known phrase.

Following the Pellegrini win, Santorín was imported to the United States as Santorín II. He was "entered in, and withdrawn from, virtually every stakes run in Florida" during the first three months of 1974, due to a fever. In his first race in the United States, the Grade 1 Widener Handicap, he was assigned 119 pounds, and was unplaced. The following month, he ran in the Grade 2 Hialeah Turf Cup Handicap, carrying 116 pounds and finishing third, despite being bothered in the stretch.

Race Record 

One other start is not included.

Stud Career
Santorín stood at stud at his owner's Haras Barlovento. There, he sired Galeno, who would go on to win two of the Peruvian Triple Crown races as well as the Gran Premio Latinoamericano.

Pedigree

References 

1970 racehorse births
1993 racehorse deaths
Racehorses bred in Peru
Thoroughbred family 7